Total Dadagiri is an Indian Bengali-language romantic action comedy film directed by Pathikrit Basu and produced by Mahendra Soni. This film was released on 19 January 2018 in the banner of Shree Venkatesh Films. Yash Dasgupta and Mimi Chakraborty played lead roles in it. Music direction of the film was made by Jeet Gannguli. The film is a remake of the 2017 Telugu film Nenu Local starring Nani and Keerthy Suresh.

Plot 
It is the teen love story of two college going students Joy and Jonaki. Joy is an engineering student, who failed repeatedly, falls in love at first sight with an MBA student Jonaki. Jonaki's father, the professor of the college who stands seriously against their love. The couple now try to convince their parents.

Cast

Soundtrack

References

External links
 

Bengali-language Indian films
2010s Bengali-language films
2018 films
Bengali remakes of Telugu films
Indian romantic comedy films
2018 romantic comedy films
Films scored by Jeet Ganguly